On the night of 22 December 1970, a fire broke out inside the York Hotel on Coatham Road in Redcar, North Yorkshire,  England. The fire killed four people inside the building.

References

Fires in England
1970 fires in the United Kingdom 
1970 in England